Minnigerode is a surname. Notable people with this name include:
Charles Minnigerode (1814–1894), German-born American professor and clergyman
Lucy Minnigerode (1871-1935), American nurse
Marietta Minnigerode Andrews (born Marietta Fauntleroy Minnigerode, 1869-1931), American painter and designer
Meade Minnigerode (1887–1967), American writer
Patricia Minnigerode (died 1952), first wife of Arthur Ponsonby, 11th Earl of Bessborough

See also
Charles Minnigerode Beckwith (1851-1928), American bishop